Bessel was a cargo ship that was built in 1925 as Sorrento by AG Weser, Bremen for German owners. She was sold in 1926 and renamed Bessel. She was seized by the Allies in Vigo, Spain, in May 1945, passed to the Ministry of War Transport (MoWT) and renamed Empire Coniston. In 1946, she was lent to the Danish Government and was allocated to them in 1947. She was sold into Danish merchant service and renamed Birgitte Skou. In 1959, she was sold to Italy and renamed N Martini. She was renamed Nicolo Martini in 1961, serving until 1972 when she ran aground at Portoscuso, Sardinia. Although refloated she was declared a total loss and was scrapped in 1973.

Description
The ship was built in 1925 as yard number 395 by AG Weser, Bremen.

The ship had a GRT of 1,878 and a NRT of 915.

The ship was propelled by two 4-stroke Single Cycle Single Acting diesel engines, which had 6 cylinders of  diameter by  stroke. The engines were built by AG Weser.

History
Sorrento was built for Robert M Sloman Jr, Hamburg. In October 1926, she was sold to Otwi Werke GmbH, Bremen and renamed Bessel. In December 1928, she was sold to Dampschiffs Gesellschaft Neptun, Bremen. The Code Letters RFLM were allocated. In 1934, her Code Letters were changed to DOIE.

In 1940, Bessel was requisitioned by the Kriegsmarine. She put into Vigo, Spain, during 1940 where she remained for the duration of the war. Bessel was used to refuel U-boats eight times during the war. Although supposedly a merchant ship, she was camouflaged. In May 1945, she was surrendered to the United Kingdom, and sailed from Vigo to the UK in August 1945.

Ownership passed to the MoWT and she was placed under the management of Stone & Rolfe Ltd. Her port of registry was changed to London and the Code letters GTFY and United Kingdom Official Number 180717 were allocated. In 1946, Empire Coniston was lent to the Danish Government. She was passed to them in 1947 and sold to Ove Skou Rederiaktieselskab in 1947, when she was renamed Birgitte Skou. Her port of registry was changed to Kobenhavn and the Code Letters OXZI were allocated. On 6 November 1951, a fire on board the ship while docked at Valencia, Spain affected the crew accommodation area. Birgitte Skou was repaired and returned to service. On 21 January 1952, there was an industrial dispute while the ship was moored at Helsingør, Denmark. In April 1958, she was laid up in Kobenhavn. In September 1959, Birgitte Skou was sold to Armamento Agenzia Marittima Framar, Genoa, Italy. She was operated under the management of M Martini, Italy and was renamed N Martini. She was renamed Nicolo Martini in 1961. With the introduction of IMO Numbers in the 1960s, Nicolo Martini was allocated the IMO Number 5251496.

On 24 April 1972, Nicolo Martini struck a submerged object at Portoscuso, Sardinia while on a voyage from Caloforte to Genoa. She developed a leak and was beached to prevent her sinking. Although refloated, she was declared a total loss. In December 1972, she was sold for scrap. Nicolo Martini was scrapped in October 1973 at Vado Ligure, Italy.

References

External links
Photo of Bessel during the Second World War
Photo of Birgitte Skou

1925 ships
Ships built in Bremen (state)
Merchant ships of Germany
World War II merchant ships of Germany
Auxiliary ships of the Kriegsmarine
Ministry of War Transport ships
Empire ships
Merchant ships of the United Kingdom
Merchant ships of Denmark
Maritime incidents in 1951
Merchant ships of Italy
Maritime incidents in 1972